Julio Enrique Gómez González (born 13 August 1994), also known as "La Momia", is a Mexican former professional footballer who played as a winger.

Club career

Pachuca
Julio Gomez (La Momia)  made his debut for CF Pachuca against Santos Laguna in January 2011, in a game of 2011 Clausura He was then loaned to Correcaminos and scored 13 goals in Clausura 2015. He was declared MVP by Correcaminos. Then Pachuca loaned him to Cafetaleros de Tapachula for the 2015–16 season.

International career

2011 FIFA U-17 World Cup
Gómez was a regular starter in Mexico's squad. In the second match against Congo; Gómez scored one of the two goals from Mexico.

In the semifinal match against Germany he scored two goals, the first of them in the third minute. In the play that derived in the second goal for Mexico, an Olympic goal by Jonathan Espericueta, Gomez's head collided with Samed Yeşil's, after which he was left lying on the field, bleeding heavily. With no substitutions left, he returned to the field and scored the winning goal with a memorable bicycle kick in the last minutes of the match, and gave Mexico the pass to the final against Uruguay.

He was not a starter in the final. However, he entered the game in the 80th minute, receiving a standing ovation from the fans. Mexico ended up defeating Uruguay 2–0, winning the championship.

Gómez was awarded the Golden Ball of the tournament. In total, he scored three goals, and participated in all seven games - six as starter, and as a substitute in the final.

Honours
Mexico U17
FIFA U-17 World Cup: 2011

Mexico U20
CONCACAF U-20 Championship: 2013

Individual
FIFA U-17 World Cup Golden Ball: 2011

References

1994 births
Living people
Footballers from Tamaulipas
Sportspeople from Tampico, Tamaulipas
Association football wingers
Association football midfielders
Mexican footballers
Mexico youth international footballers
C.F. Pachuca players
C.D. Guadalajara footballers
Correcaminos UAT footballers
Cafetaleros de Chiapas footballers
Coras de Nayarit F.C. footballers
Club Atlético Zacatepec players
Liga MX players